Podell is a surname of English  Ashkenazi, and Polish origin. Notable people with the surname include:

Albert Podell (born 1937), magazine editor and writer
Bertram L. Podell (1925–2005), American politician
Eyal Podell (born 1975), Israeli-born American actor and screenwriter
Jules Podell (1899–1973), American businessman

References